Mandraka Dam is a gravity dam on the Mandraka River near Mandraka in the Analamanga Region of Madagascar. The dam was constructed by a French firm by 1956 and creates Lake Mandraka.

Mandraka Power Station
The dam supplies water to a  hydroelectric power station  to the east, down in the valley. The dam and power station are operated and owned by Jirama and the four  Pelton turbine-generators were commissioned between 1958 and 1972.

See also

Mantasoa Dam – regulates water flow to Mandraka Dam

References

Dams in Madagascar
Analamanga
Gravity dams
Dams completed in 1956
20th-century architecture in Madagascar